Charles Morgan may refer to:

Politicians
 Sir Charles Morgan, 1st Baronet (1726–1806), Member of Parliament for Brecon, 1778–1787, and Breconshire, 1787–1806
 Charles Morgan (Breconshire MP, born 1736) (1736–1787), Member of Parliament for Brecon, 1763–1769
 Sir Charles Morgan, 2nd Baronet (1760–1846), Member of Parliament for Brecon, 1787–1796, and Monmouthshire, 1796–1831
 Charles Morgan, 1st Baron Tredegar (1792–1875), MP for Brecon, 1812–1818, 1830–1832 and 1835–1847
 Octavius Morgan (Charles Octavius Swinnerton Morgan, 1803–1888), British politician, historian and antiquary; MP for Monmouthshire, 1841–1874
 Charles Rodney Morgan (1828–1854), British Member of Parliament for Brecon
 Charles Henry Morgan (1842–1912), US congressman from Missouri
 Charles Morgan (Australian politician) (1897–1967), Australian politician

Sportsmen
 Charles Morgan (Surrey cricketer) (1839–1904), English cricketer
 Charles Morgan (Queensland cricketer) (1877–1942), Australian cricketer
 Charles Morgan (coach) (c. 1890–19??), American football coach in the United States
 Charles Morgan (Victoria cricketer) (1900–1965), Australian cricketer
 Charles Morgan (Nottinghamshire cricketer) (1917–2001), English cricketer
 Charlie Morgan (soccer) (born 1962), retired American soccer defender
 Charlie Morgan (cricketer) (born 1989), English cricketer
 Charles Morgan (racing driver), American racing driver, see 2007 Rolex Sports Car Series season

Military
 Charles Morgan (military governor) (c. 1575–1643), military governor of Bergen op Zoom
 Charles Morgan (British Army officer) (1741–1818), Commander-in-Chief, India
 Charles Morgan (American soldier) (1745–1803), spy during the Revolutionary War
 Charles W. Morgan (naval officer) (1790–1853), officer in the United States Navy during the War of 1812
 Charles Hale Morgan (1834–1875), American Civil War general

Others
 Charles Morgan (Master of Clare College, Cambridge) (1678–1736), Master of Clare 1726–1736
 Charles Morgan (businessman) (1795–1878), American railroad and shipping magnate
 Charles Waln Morgan (1796–1861), whaling industry executive, banker and businessman
 Charles Hill Morgan (1831–1911), American mechanical engineer and inventor
 Charles Eldridge Morgan, Jr. (1844–1917), co-founded the law firm Morgan Lewis
 Charles Langbridge Morgan (engineer) (1855–1940), British civil engineer
 Charles Langbridge Morgan (1894–1958), English critic, novelist and playwright
 Charles Morgan (actor) (1909–1994), Welsh actor
 Charles Morgan Jr. (1930–2009), U.S. civil rights attorney
 Charles Morgan (automaker) (born 1951), ex-MD of Morgan Motor Company
 Charlie Morgan (musician) (born 1955), English drummer and percussionist
 Charles A. Morgan III, American psychiatrist

See also
 Charles W. Morgan (ship), an American whaling ship, named for Charles Waln Morgan
 Charlie Morgan (disambiguation)